Riec-sur-Bélon is a commune in the Finistère department of Brittany in north-western France.

Population
Inhabitants of Riec-sur-Bélon are called in French Riécois.

Breton language
The municipality launched a linguistic plan concerning the Breton language through Ya d'ar brezhoneg on 16 December 2008.

International relations
Riec-sur-Bélon is twinned with:
 Ilminster, Somerset, United Kingdom

See also
Communes of the Finistère department

References

External links

Official website

Mayors of Finistère Association 

Communes of Finistère